The 1920 Presbyterian Blue Hose football team represented Presbyterian College as an independent during the 1920 college football season. Led by the fifth-year head coach Walter A. Johnson, Presbyterian compiled a record of 5–1–1. The team captain was Lonnie McMillian.

Schedule

References

Presbyterian
Presbyterian Blue Hose football seasons
Presbyterian Blue Hose football